William Houston (c. 1746–1788) was one of the Founding Fathers of the United States.

William Houston may also refer to:

Sir William Houston, 1st Baronet (1766–1842), Governor of Gibraltar
William Houston (actor) (born 1968), British actor
William Houstoun (botanist) (1695–1733), Scottish surgeon and botanist
William C. Houston (1852–1931), American politician and U.S. Representative from Tennessee
William J. Houston (born 1968), American Navy officer
William V. Houston (1900–1968), American physicist
Will Houston (referee) (born 1988), Australian professional rugby union referee
Bill Houston (American football) (born 1951), American football wide receiver
Bill Houston (Australian footballer) (1918–1982), Australian rules footballer
Bill Houston, singer/songwriter, see North of Superior

See also
William Houstoun (disambiguation)